Several cutaneous conditions can be diagnosed with the aid of immunofluorescence studies.

Cutaneous conditions with positive direct or indirect immunofluorescence when using salt-split skin include:

For several subtypes of pemphigus a variety of substrates are used for indirect immunofluorescence:

See also 
 List of cutaneous conditions
 List of genes mutated in cutaneous conditions
 List of cutaneous conditions caused by mutations in keratins

References 

 
 

Cutaneous conditions
Dermatology-related lists